The third series of The Bill, a British television drama, consisted of twelve episodes, broadcast between 21 September and 7 December 1987. The series was first released on DVD as part of a three-season box set on 10 May 2006 in Australia. It was later made available as a separate season in the United Kingdom on 28 May 2007 and in Australia on 3 August 2011. The above DVD artwork is taken from the most recent Australian release. It features an image of Ch. Supt. Charles Brownlow. The British artwork features a collage image featuring DI Roy Galloway, PCs Nick Shaw and Viv Martella, and DC Mike Dashwood. The image right is the Australian three-season DVD box set features a sole image of chief superintendent Charles Brownlow.

Many of the cast and crew shared their memories of making this third series for the book Witness Statements, including stars John Salthouse, Eric Richard, Trudie Goodwin, Mark Wingett, Peter Ellis, Nula Conwell, Jon Iles, Larry Dann, Colin Blumenau, Robert Hudson, Mark Powley, Sonesh Sira and Graham Cole; along with writers Barry Appleton, Lionel Goldstein, Edwin Pearce and Christopher Russell, producer Peter Cregeen and director Michael Ferguson.

Cast changes

Arrivals
 Inspector Brian Kite
 PC Danesh Patel
 PC Ken Melvin

Departures
 PC Nick Shaw
 PC Danesh Patel
 Inspector Brian Kite
DI Roy Galloway

Episodes

1987 British television seasons
The Bill series